The Oklahoma Agricultural Experiment Station is a research facility located on the campus of Oklahoma State University-Stillwater (OSU), and part of its Division of Agricultural Sciences and Natural Resources. It conducts research in agriculture, natural resources, rural economies and social issues, and accounts for 37% of the research conducted at OSU.

The station was established by the Hatch Act of 1887.

References

Agricultural research institutes in the United States
Oklahoma State University
Research institutes in Oklahoma